Alyce Parker (born 15 August 2000) is an Australian rules footballer playing for the Greater Western Sydney Giants in the AFL Women's competition (AFLW).

Parker grew up in Holbrook, New South Wales, and was an active participant in numerous sports before trying Australian Rules in year seven.

She was selected at pick 12 in the 2018 draft and made her debut in round one of the 2019 season.

She was a two-time Under-18 All Australian as a junior and received a nomination for the rising star award for her debut game against . The 2020 AFL Women's season saw Parker obtain her first AFL Women's All-Australian team selection, named on the interchange bench. In the 2021 AFL Women's season, Parker was awarded with her second consecutive All-Australian blazer, named in the rover position. Parker achieved selection in Champion Data's 2021 AFLW All-Star stats team, after leading the league for average contested possessions in the 2021 AFL Women's season, totalling 14.9 a game, the highest number ever recorded in the AFLW to that point.

Statistics
Statistics are correct to the end of the 2021 season.

|- style="background:#EAEAEA"
| scope="row" text-align:center | 2019
| 
| 3 || 7 || 0 || 3 || 67 || 47 || 114 || 13 || 29 || 0.0 || 0.4 || 9.6 || 6.7 || 16.3 || 1.9 || 4.1 || 0
|- 
| scope="row" text-align:center | 2020
| 
| 3 || 7 || 0 || 2 || 100 || 48 || 148 || 19 || 20 || 0.0 || 0.3 || 14.3 || 6.9 || 21.1 || 2.7 || 2.9 || 6
|- style="background:#EAEAEA"
| scope="row" text-align:center | 2021
| 
| 3 || 9 || 1 || 2 || 141 || 74 || 215 || 27 || 46 || 0.1 || 0.2 || 15.7 || 8.2 || bgcolor=FFBBFF | 23.9‡ || 3.0 || 5.1 || 14
|- class="sortbottom"
! colspan=3 | Career
! 23
! 1
! 7
! 308
! 169
! 477
! 59
! 95
! 0.1
! 0.3
! 13.4
! 7.3
! 20.7
! 2.6
! 4.1
! 6
|}

References

External links 

 2000 births
Australian rules footballers from New South Wales
Living people
Greater Western Sydney Giants (AFLW) players